Aleksey Aleksandrovich Chervotkin (born 30 April 1995) is a Russian cross-country skier who competes internationally with the Russian national team.

He competed at the FIS Nordic World Ski Championships 2017 in Lahti, Finland, in men's 4 × 10 km relay and won the silver medal.

Cross-country skiing results
All results are sourced from the International Ski Federation (FIS).

Olympic Games
 2 medals – (1 gold, 1 silver)

Distance reduced to 30 km due to weather conditions.

World Championships
 2 medals – (2 silver)

World Cup

Season standings

Individual podiums
 4 podiums – (1 , 3 )

Team podiums
 2 podiums

Personal life
Chervotkin is an alumnus of the Penza State University's Faculty of Institute of Physical Education.

Notes

References

External links

1995 births
Living people
People from Kotelnichsky District
Penza State University alumni
Russian male cross-country skiers
FIS Nordic World Ski Championships medalists in cross-country skiing
Olympic cross-country skiers of Russia
Cross-country skiers at the 2018 Winter Olympics
Cross-country skiers at the 2022 Winter Olympics
Medalists at the 2018 Winter Olympics
Medalists at the 2022 Winter Olympics
Olympic gold medalists for the Russian Olympic Committee athletes
Olympic silver medalists for Olympic Athletes from Russia
Olympic medalists in cross-country skiing
Tour de Ski skiers
Sportspeople from Kirov Oblast